Call Girl is a 2012 political thriller film directed by Mikael Marcimain and written by Marietta von Hausswolff von Baumgarten. It stars Sofia Karemyr, Simon J. Berger and Josefin Asplund. The story is a fictionalised version of events based on the so-called  political scandal of 1970s Sweden which linked several prominent politicians to a prostitution ring that included underage girls.

Plot
Set against the backdrop of the 1976 election, the story is centered on delinquent teenager Iris, who is sent to live in a juvenile home. She meets Sonja there and the two regularly slip away for adventures in the city. Together they are recruited to the prostitution ring operated by Dagmar Glans, a madam well known to the authorities. Dagmar's clients are mostly rich and powerful men, including senior politicians of the day. She becomes the subject of a police investigation led by a young vice officer, John Sandberg. Sandberg soon discovers Glans has powerful clients but also finds his investigation hampered by his superiors and his life threatened by sinister figures. Police break up the prostitution ring but the powerful clients avoid being named in the scandal and Dagmar's trial concludes with her receiving a suspended sentence before Iris can testify about being an underage prostitute. In the aftermath of the trial, Sandberg is killed in a hit and run incident and his report into the affair is classified by the newly elected government. The film ends with Iris running away from the juvenile home, her ultimate fate ambiguous.

Cast

Reception
On review aggregator website Rotten Tomatoes, the film holds an 80% rank based on 15 reviews, with an average rating of 7.1/10.

Accolades
It received the FIPRESCI Discovery prize at the 2012 Toronto International Film Festival.
The film opened the Stockholm International Film Festival in November 2012. It went on to win the Silver Audience Award, which is voted for by the audience during the festival.

It was later nominated in 11 categories at the 48th Guldbagge Awards, including Best Film, Best Director and Best Screenplay, and won in four.

References

External links

2012 thriller drama films
2010s political thriller films
Drama films based on actual events
Films about child prostitution
Films directed by Mikael Marcimain
Films set in 1976
Films set in Stockholm
Films shot in Gothenburg
Films shot in Stockholm
Finnish thriller drama films
Irish thriller drama films
Norwegian thriller drama films
Prostitution in Sweden
Sexploitation films
Swedish thriller drama films
Thriller films based on actual events
2010s Swedish films